The Metropolis of Iconium is a metropolitan bishopric of the Ecumenical Patriarchate of Constantinople located at Iconium in Asia Minor, in the region of Lycaonia. It flourished through the Roman and Byzantine empires, and survived into the Ottoman Empire until the early 20th century and the Greco-Turkish population exchange, which led to the disappearance of the local Christian population. 
 
The see continues to be occupied today as a titular see of the Ecumenical Patriarchate of Constantinople. The current incumbent is Theoleptos Fenerlis, who was raised to the see in 2000.

History
Christianity came to Iconium very early. The apostles Paul came to Iconium escaping a disturbance and attempted stoning. It is presumed that Paul appointed bishops or presbyters during his visit.

From ca. 370, the see of Iconium became the metropolis of Lycaonia. The city fell to the Seljuk Turks in 1084, and became the capital of the Sultanate of Rum, except for a brief recapture by the First Crusade in 1097.

The fate of the see in the early Ottoman period is obscure: Metropolitan Amphilochius is mentioned as occupying the see until 1488, but it is unclear whether any bishop actually resided in the city, as this is not attested in the patriarchal ordinances (berat) of 1483 and 1525. The historian Elisabeth Zachariadou suggested that the seat of the metropolitan was moved at the time to Egridir, but this can not be verified. The see was definitely revived in the 17th century, as the patriarchal berat of 1625 once again refers to the city as the seat of a residential metropolitan. Iconium remained the seat of the metropolis until the 19th century, when it moved to Niğde, where the Greek Orthodox element was stronger. During the Ottoman period, the Metropolitan of Iconium also received the former metropolis of Tyana, whence his full title was "Metropolitan of Iconium and Tyana, hypertimos and exarch of all Lycaonia and Second Cappadocia".

Known residential bishops

The French historian Michel Le Quien names the following bishops:
 Sosipater 
 Terentus
 Caronatus (martyr) 
 Celsus
 Nicomas
 Peter
 Eulalius
 Fastinus 
 Amphilocius 
 Valerianus
 Onesiphorus, Bishop of Iconium.
 Amphilocius of Iconium, 
 Palladius
 Theodulus 
 Paul
 Elias
 Leo
 Theopylactus
 Theophilus
 Basil 
 John II 
 unnamed bishop, attended a synod in Constantinople in 1077
 Eustathius 
 Nicetas
 unnamed bishop, attended synod in Constantinople in 1152
 John III 
 unnamed bishop 
 Theodorus II
 Matthaeus (Catholic)
 Aphilochius (?–1488)
 Parthenius 
 Clemens
 Sylvester 
 Prokopios Lazaridis (1911-1923)

References

Sources
 

Dioceses established in the 1st century
Defunct dioceses of the Ecumenical Patriarchate of Constantinople
Iconium
History of Konya
Culture in Konya
Konya vilayet
Lycaonia
Niğde